Project Runway is an American reality television show in which contestants compete to be the best fashion designer, as determined by the show's judges. The series first broadcast in 2004, and seventeen regular seasons and seven all-stars seasons have aired as of June 2019. The first five seasons aired on Bravo, while the succeeding seasons aired on Lifetime. Project Runway contestants are chosen by the show's producers through an application process that includes a videotape submission and "virtual portfolio" of sketches and completed designs, semi-final interviews at select cities, and a final interview.

Two hundred contestants have competed, three of whom have competed twice—Daniel Franco competed in both Season 1 and Season 2 and Kate Pankoke in Season 11 and Season 12 in addition to Amanda Valentine in Season 11 and Season 13. Angela Keslar and Vincent Libretti were originally eliminated in Episodes 8 and 9, respectively, of Season 3, but were brought back due to that season's twist. Justin LeBlanc would have originally been eliminated in Episode 6 of Season 12, but was given a second chance due to the newly instituted "Tim Gunn Save". During Season 13, the "Tim Gunn Save" was used to retroactively bring Charketa Glover back into the competition for Episode 7 after she was eliminated in Episode 6. Seven contestants left Project Runway for reasons other than being eliminated by the show's judges. Keith Michael was disqualified in Season 3 for bringing design books to the contest, which is prohibited. On the other hand, Jack Mackenroth of Season 4, Maya Luz of Season 7, Cecilia Motwani of Season 9, Andrea Katz of Season 10, Kooan Kosuke of Season 10, and Sandro Masmanidi of Season 12 all withdrew from the show due to personal reasons.

The 18 winners of the regular series are Jay McCarroll, Chloe Dao, Jeffrey Sebelia, Christian Siriano, Leanne Marshall, Irina Shabayeva, Seth Aaron Henderson, Gretchen Jones, Anya Ayoung-Chee, Dmitry Sholokhov, Michelle Lesniak, Dom Streater, Sean Kelly, Ashley Nell Tipton, Erin Robertson, Kentaro Kameyama, Sebastian Grey, and Geoffrey Mac. The 7 winners of the All-Star series are Mondo Guerra, Anthony Ryan Auld, Seth Aaron Henderson, Dmitry Sholokhov, Dom Streater, Anthony Williams and Michelle Lesniak.

Regular Series Contestants

 Contestant's age at the start of the season
 Angela Keslar and Vincent Lebretti were eliminated by judges during Episodes 8 and 9, respectively, of Season 3, but were brought back due to that season's twist.
 Chris March was eliminated by judges during Episode 4 of Season 4, but was brought back to the competition following the voluntary departure of Jack Mackenroth.
 Anthony Williams was eliminated by judges during Episode 10 of Season 7, but was brought back to the competition following the voluntary departure of Maya Luz.
 Joshua Christensen was eliminated by judges during Episode 2 of Season 9, but was brought back to the competition following the voluntary departure of Cecelia Motwani.
 Raul Orosio was eliminated by judges during Episode 3 of Season 10, but was brought back to the competition following the voluntary departures of Andrea Katz and Kooan Kosuke.
 Justin LeBlanc was eliminated by judges during Episode 6 of Season 12, but was given a second chance due to the newly instituted "Tim Gunn Save".
 Charketa "Char" Glover was eliminated by judges during Episode 6 of Season 13, but was given a second chance due to the newly instituted "Tim Gunn Save".
  Four designers have won the competition twice; Seth Aaron Henderson also won the third season of Project Runway: All Stars and Dmitry Sholokhov also won the fourth season of Project Runway: All Stars.  Dom Streater also won the fifth season of Project Runway: All Stars and Michelle Lesniak also won the seventh season of Project Runway: All Stars.

All Stars Edition Contestants

Accessory Contestants

Under the Gunn Contestants

Threads Contestants

Designers and Assistants were identified by first name only
Each episode, one winner was determined amongst that episode's three designers

Junior Contestants

 Contestant's age at the start of the season
In 2014, Zachary won episode 3 of Project Runway: Threads

References

General
 
 
 
 
 
 
 
 

Specific

Lists of reality show participants
 List